SS Richard Randall was a Liberty ship built in the United States during World War II. She was named after Richard Randall, a privateer and founder of Sailors' Snug Harbor.

Construction
Richard Randall was laid down on 2 October 1944, under a Maritime Commission (MARCOM) contract, MC hull 2383, by J.A. Jones Construction, Brunswick, Georgia; she was sponsored by Mrs. Edward C. Marshall, and launched on 4 November 1944.

History
She was allocated to Isbrandtsen Steamship Co. Inc., on 16 November 1944. On 29 July 1949, she was laid up in the National Defense Reserve Fleet, in Mobile, Alabama. On 23 October 1964, she was sold for $54,240, to Pinto Island Metals Co., for scrapping. She was removed from the fleet on 3 November 1964.

References

Bibliography

 
 
 
 
 

 

Liberty ships
Ships built in Brunswick, Georgia
1944 ships
Mobile Reserve Fleet